Hubert Aaronson (July 10, 1924 – December 13, 2005) was an R.F. Mehl University Professor at Carnegie Mellon University.

Biography
Hubert I. Aaronson was born on July 10, 1924, in New York City. In 1936, Aaronson moved to New Jersey and graduated high school. He graduated Carnegie Institute of Technology (CIT) which is currently known as Carnegie Mellon University, majoring in engineering.

Aaronson went to the U.S. Army Air Corps and went on to fly many B-17 missions during World War II.

Career
Aaronson received a B.S. in 1948, M.S. in 1954, and a Ph.D. in 1954 at the Carnegie Institute of Technology for metallurgical engineering. In 1970, he served many TMS and ASM committees as a member and a chair such as the Phase Transformations Committee. Aaronson received an honorary membership of the Japan Institute of Metals in 1996, and was then elected for the National Academy of Engineering in 1997.

Aaronson continued working as a R.F. Mehl Professor Emeritus at the Carnegie Mellon University before his death on December 13, 2005, after a lengthy illness.

Awards
Aaronson received honors and awards such as the TMS C. H. Mathewson Gold Medal, TMS Educator Award, TMS Institute of Metals Lecture, R. F. Mehl Medal, and TMS Fellow.

Works
Aaronson has published more than 300 scientific papers for teaching and supporting his young colleagues, and has organized conferences that influenced with the field. His well-known major contributions are about diffusional nucleation and growth, and the mechanisms of phase transformations.

References

External links 
Hubert I. Aaronson, Masato Enomoto, Jong K. Lee Mechanisms of Diffusional Phase Transformations in Metals and Alloys

1924 births
2005 deaths
American materials scientists
Carnegie Mellon University alumni
Carnegie Mellon University faculty
United States Army Air Forces personnel of World War II
Fellows of the Minerals, Metals & Materials Society